Lucas Dario Moscariello (born 19 February 1992) is an Argentine handball player for BM Benidorm and the Argentine national team.

He participated at the 2017 World Men's Handball Championship.

References

1992 births
Living people
Argentine male handball players
Liga ASOBAL players
Expatriate handball players
Argentine expatriate sportspeople in Spain
South American Games silver medalists for Argentina
South American Games medalists in handball
Sportspeople from Buenos Aires
Competitors at the 2018 South American Games
Handball players at the 2019 Pan American Games
Pan American Games medalists in handball
Pan American Games gold medalists for Argentina
Medalists at the 2019 Pan American Games
Handball players at the 2020 Summer Olympics
21st-century Argentine people